Mescaline or mescalin (3,4,5-trimethoxyphenethylamine) is a naturally occurring psychedelic protoalkaloid of the substituted phenethylamine class, known for its hallucinogenic effects comparable to those of LSD and psilocybin.

Biological sources
It occurs naturally in several species of cacti. It is also found in small amounts in certain members of the bean family, Fabaceae, including Acacia berlandieri. However those claims concerning Acacia species have been challenged and have been unsupported in any additional analysis.

History and use
Peyote has been used for at least 5,700 years by Indigenous peoples of the Americas in Mexico. Europeans noted use of peyote in Native American religious ceremonies upon early contact, notably by the Huichols in Mexico. Other mescaline-containing cacti such as the San Pedro have a long history of use in South America, from Peru to Ecuador. While religious and ceremonial peyote use was widespread in the Aztec empire and northern Mexico at the time of the Spanish conquest, religious persecution confined it to areas near the Pacific coast and up to southwest Texas. However, by 1880, peyote use began to spread north of South-Central America with "a new kind of peyote ceremony" inaugurated by the Kiowa and Comanche people. These religious practices, incorporated legally in the United States in 1920 as the Native American Church, has since spread as far as Saskatchewan, Canada.

In traditional peyote preparations, the top of the cactus is cut off, leaving the large tap root along with a ring of green photosynthesizing area to grow new heads. These heads are then dried to make disc-shaped buttons. Buttons are chewed to produce the effects or soaked in water to drink. However, the taste of the cactus is bitter, so contemporary users will often grind it into a powder and pour it into capsules to avoid having to taste it. The usual human dosage is 200–400 milligrams of mescaline sulfate or 178–356 milligrams of mescaline hydrochloride. The average  peyote button contains about 25 mg mescaline. 

Mescaline was first isolated and identified in 1897 by the German chemist Arthur Heffter and first synthesized in 1919 by Ernst Späth.

In 1955, English politician Christopher Mayhew took part in an experiment for BBC's Panorama, in which he ingested 400 mg of mescaline under the supervision of psychiatrist Humphry Osmond. Though the recording was deemed too controversial and ultimately omitted from the show, Mayhew praised the experience, calling it "the most interesting thing I ever did".

Potential medical usage 
Mescaline has a wide array of suggested medical usage, including treatment of alcoholism and depression. However, its status as a Schedule I controlled substance in the Convention on Psychotropic Substances limits availability of the drug to researchers. Because of this, very few studies concerning mescaline's activity and potential therapeutic effects in humans have been conducted since the early 1970s.

Biosynthesis 
Mescaline is biosynthesized from tyrosine which, in turn, is derived from phenylalanine by the enzyme phenylalanine hydroxylase. In Lophophora williamsii (Peyote), dopamine converts into mescaline in a biosynthetic pathway involving m-O-methylation and aromatic hydroxylation.

Tyrosine and phenylalanine serve as the metabolic precursors to synthesis of mescaline. Tyrosine can either undergo a decarboxylation via tyrosine decarboxylase to generate tyramine and subsequently undergo an oxidation at carbon 3 by a monophenol hydroxylase or first be hydroxylated by tyrosine hydroxylase to form L-DOPA and decarboxylated by DOPA decarboxylase. These create dopamine, which then experiences methylation by a catechol-O-methyltransferase (COMT) by an S-adenosyl methionine (SAM)-dependent mechanism. The resulting intermediate is then oxidized again by a hydroxylase enzyme, likely monophenol hydroxylase again, at carbon 5, and methylated by COMT. The product, methylated at the two meta positions with respect to the alkyl substituent, experiences a final methylation at the 4 carbon by a guaiacol-O-methyltransferase, which also operates by a SAM-dependent mechanism. This final methylation step results in the production of mescaline.

Phenylalanine serves as a precursor by first being converted to L-tyrosine by L-amino acid hydroxylase. Once converted, it follows the same pathway as described above.

Laboratory synthesis

Mescaline was first synthesized in 1919 by Ernst Späth from 3,4,5-trimethoxybenzoyl chloride. Subsequent to this, numerous approaches utilizing different starting materials have been developed. Notable examples include the following:
 Hofmann rearrangement of 3,4,5-trimethoxyphenylpropionamide.
 Cyanohydrin reaction between potassium cyanide and 3,4,5-trimethoxybenzaldehyde followed by acetylation and reduction.
 Henry reaction of 3,4,5-trimethoxybenzaldehyde with nitromethane followed by nitro compound reduction of ω-nitrotrimethoxystyrene.
 Ozonolysis of elemicin followed by reductive amination.
 Ester reduction of Eudesmic acid's methyl ester followed by halogenation, Kolbe nitrile synthesis, and nitrile reduction.
 Amide reduction of 3,4,5-trimethoxyphenylacetamide.
Reduction of 3,4,5-trimethoxy-(2-nitrovinyl)benzene with lithium aluminum hydride.
 Treatment of tricarbonyl(η6-1,2,3-trimethoxybenzene) chromium complex with acetonitrile carbanion in THF and iodine, followed by reduction of the nitrile with lithium aluminum hydride.

Pharmacokinetics
Tolerance builds with repeated usage, lasting for a few days. Mescaline causes cross-tolerance with other serotonergic psychedelics such as LSD and psilocybin.

About half the initial dosage is excreted after 6 hours, but some studies suggest that it is not metabolized at all before excretion. Mescaline appears not to be subject to metabolism by CYP2D6 and between 20% and 50% of mescaline is excreted in the urine unchanged, with the rest being excreted as the deaminated-oxidised-carboxylic acid form of mescaline, a likely result of MAO degradation. The LD50 of mescaline has been measured in various animals: 212 mg/kg i.p. (mice), 132 mg/kg i.p. (rats), and 328 mg/kg i.p. (guinea pigs). For humans, the LD50 of mescaline has been reported to be approximately 880 mg/kg.

Behavioral and non-behavioral effects 

Mescaline induces a psychedelic state comparable to those produced by LSD and psilocybin, but with unique characteristics. Subjective effects may include altered thinking processes, an altered sense of time and self-awareness, and closed- and open-eye visual phenomena.

Prominence of color is distinctive, appearing brilliant and intense. Recurring visual patterns observed during the mescaline experience include stripes, checkerboards, angular spikes, multicolor dots, and very simple fractals that turn very complex. The English writer Aldous Huxley described these self-transforming amorphous shapes as like animated stained glass illuminated from light coming through the eyelids in his autobiographical book The Doors of Perception (1954). Like LSD, mescaline induces distortions of form and kaleidoscopic experiences but they manifest more clearly with eyes closed and under low lighting conditions.

Heinrich Klüver coined the term "cobweb figure" in the 1920s to describe one of the four form constant geometric visual hallucinations experienced in the early stage of a mescaline trip: "Colored threads running together in a revolving center, the whole similar to a cobweb". The other three are the chessboard design, tunnel, and spiral. Klüver wrote that "many 'atypical' visions are upon close inspection nothing but variations of these form-constants."
 
As with LSD, synesthesia can occur especially with the help of music. An unusual but unique characteristic of mescaline use is the "geometrization" of three-dimensional objects. The object can appear flattened and distorted, similar to the presentation of a Cubist painting.

Mescaline elicits a pattern of sympathetic arousal, with the peripheral nervous system being a major target for this substance.

Mechanism of action 
Mescaline is produced when products of natural mammalian catecholamine-based neuronal signaling such as dopamine and noradrenaline are subjected to additional metabolism via methylation, and mescaline's hallucinogenic properties stem from its structural similarities with these two neurotransmitters. In plants, this compound may be the end-product of a pathway utilizing catecholamines as a method of stress response, similar to how animals may release such compounds and others such as cortisol when stressed. The in vivo function of catecholamines in plants has not been investigated, but they may function as antioxidants, as developmental signals, and as integral cell wall components that resist degradation from pathogens. The deactivation of catecholamines via methylation produces alkaloids such as mescaline.

In humans, Mescaline acts similarly to other psychedelic agents. It acts as an agonist, binding to and activating the serotonin 5-HT2A receptor with a high affinity. How activating the 5-HT2A receptor leads to psychedelia is still unknown, but it is likely that somehow it involves excitation of neurons in the prefrontal cortex. Mescaline is also known to have even greater binding affinity for the serotonin 5-HT2C receptor.

Difluoromescaline and trifluoromescaline are more potent than mescaline, as is its amphetamine homologue trimethoxyamphetamine. Escaline and proscaline are also both more potent than mescaline, showing the importance of the 4-position substituent with regard to receptor binding.

Legality

United States 
In the United States, mescaline was made illegal in 1970 by the Comprehensive Drug Abuse Prevention and Control Act, categorized as a Schedule I hallucinogen. The drug is prohibited internationally by the 1971 Convention on Psychotropic Substances. Mescaline is legal only for certain religious groups (such as the Native American Church by the American Indian Religious Freedom Act of 1978) and in scientific and medical research. In 1990, the Supreme Court ruled that the state of Oregon could ban the use of mescaline in Native American religious ceremonies. The Religious Freedom Restoration Act (RFRA) in 1993 allowed the use of peyote in religious ceremony, but in 1997, the Supreme Court ruled that the RFRA is unconstitutional when applied against states. Many states, including the state of Utah, have legalized peyote usage with "sincere religious intent", or within a religious organization, regardless of race.

While mescaline-containing cacti of the genus Echinopsis are technically controlled substances under the Controlled Substances Act, they are commonly sold publicly as ornamental plants.

United Kingdom 
In the United Kingdom, mescaline in purified powder form is a Class A drug. However, dried cactus can be bought and sold legally.

Australia 
Mescaline is considered a schedule 9 substance in Australia under the Poisons Standard (February 2020). A schedule 9 substance is classified as "Substances with a high potential for causing harm at low exposure and which require special precautions during manufacture, handling or use. These poisons should be available only to specialised or authorised users who have the skills necessary to handle them safely. Special regulations restricting their availability, possession, storage or use may apply."

The peyote cacti and other mescaline-containing plants such as San Pedro are illegal in Western Australia, Queensland, and the Northern Territory, whilst in other states such as Tasmania, Victoria and New South Wales, they are legal for ornamental and gardening purposes

Other countries 

In Canada, France, The Netherlands and Germany, mescaline in raw form and dried mescaline-containing cacti are considered an illegal drug. However, anyone may grow and use peyote, or Lophophora williamsii, as well as Echinopsis pachanoi and Echinopsis peruviana without restriction, as it is specifically exempt from legislation. In Canada, mescaline is classified as a schedule III drug under the Controlled Drugs and Substances Act, whereas peyote is exempt.

In Russia mescaline, its derivatives and mescaline-containing plants are banned as narcotic drugs (Schedule I).

Notable users 
Antonin Artaud wrote 1947’s The Peyote Dance, where he describes his peyote experiences in Mexico a decade earlier.
Jerry Garcia took peyote prior to forming The Grateful Dead but later switched to LSD and DMT since they were easier on the stomach.
Allen Ginsberg took peyote. Part II of Ginsberg’s poem “Howl” was inspired by a peyote vision that he had in San Francisco.
Ken Kesey took peyote prior to writing One Flew Over the Cuckoo's Nest.
Jean-Paul Sartre took mescaline shortly before the publication of his first book, L'Imaginaire; he had a bad trip during which he imagined that he was menaced by sea creatures. For many years following this, he persistently thought that he was being followed by lobsters, and became a patient of Jacques Lacan in hopes of being rid of them. Lobsters and crabs figure in his novel Nausea.
Havelock Ellis was the author of one of the first written reports to the public about an experience with mescaline (1898).
Stanisław Ignacy Witkiewicz, Polish writer, artist and philosopher, experimented with mescaline and described his experience in a 1932 book Nikotyna Alkohol Kokaina Peyotl Morfina Eter.
Aldous Huxley described his experience with mescaline in the essay The Doors of Perception (1954).
Jim Carroll in The Basketball Diaries described using peyote that a friend smuggled from Mexico.
Hunter S. Thompson wrote an extremely detailed account of his first use of mescaline in First Visit with Mescalito, and it appeared in his book Songs of the Doomed, as well as featuring heavily in his novel Fear and Loathing in Las Vegas.
Psychedelic research pioneer Alexander Shulgin said he was first inspired to explore psychedelic compounds by a mescaline experience. In 1974, Shulgin synthesized 2C-B, a psychedelic phenylethylamine derivative, structurally similar to mescaline.
Bryan Wynter produced Mars Ascends after trying the substance his first time.
George Carlin mentions mescaline use during his youth while being interviewed.
Carlos Santana told in 1989 about his mescaline use in a Rolling Stone interview.
Disney animator Ward Kimball described participating in a study of mescaline and peyote conducted by UCLA in the 1960s.
Michael Cera used real mescaline for the movie Crystal Fairy & the Magical Cactus, as expressed in an interview.
Philip K. Dick was inspired to write Flow My Tears, The Policeman Said after taking mescaline.
Arthur Kleps, a psychologist turned drug legalization advocate and writer whose Neo-American Church defended use of marijuana and hallucinogens such as LSD and peyote for spiritual enlightenment and exploration, bought, in 1960, by mail from Delta Chemical Company in New York 1 g of mescaline sulfate and took 500 mg. He experienced a psychedelic trip that caused profound changes in his life and outlook.

See also 
 List of psychedelic plants
 Psychedelic experience
 Psychoactive drug
 Entheogen
 The Doors of Perception
 Mind at Large (concept in The Doors of Perception)
 The Psychedelic Experience: A Manual Based on the Tibetan Book of the Dead

References

Further reading

External links 

 National Institutes of Health – National Institute on Drug Abuse Hallucinogen InfoFacts
 Mescaline at Erowid
 Mescaline at PsychonautWiki
 PiHKAL entry
 Mescaline entry in PiHKAL • info
 
 Mescaline: The Chemistry and Pharmacology of its Analogs, an essay by Alexander Shulgin
 Mescaline on the Mexican Border

Alkaloids found in Fabaceae
Cacti
Entheogens
Mescalines
Native American Church
Phenethylamine alkaloids
Serotonin receptor agonists